Heaven is a 1987 documentary film about beliefs concerning the afterlife and heaven in particular. The film was written and directed by Diane Keaton, and features a soundtrack by Howard Shore.

References

External links
 

1987 films
1987 documentary films
American documentary films
1987 directorial debut films
Documentary films about religion
Films directed by Diane Keaton
Films shot in California
Heaven and hell films
Films scored by Howard Shore
1980s English-language films
1980s American films